The 2017 Volta ao Algarve was a road cycling stage race that took place in the Algarve region of Portugal between 15 and 19 February 2017. It was the 43rd edition of the Volta ao Algarve and was rated as a 2.HC event as part of the 2017 UCI Europe Tour.

The race was won by Slovenian rider Primož Roglič for the  team, having taken the race lead after top-three finishes in the second and third stages. Roglič maintained a 22-second lead over 's Michał Kwiatkowski from Poland for the remainder of the race, to take the biggest stage race win of his career. The podium was completed by France's Tony Gallopin riding for the  team, a further 33 seconds in arrears of Kwiatkowski.

Two of Gallopin's teammates were to each win one of the race's sub-classifications; Tiesj Benoot won the young rider classification, finishing in eighth place overall while André Greipel won the points classification with a stage win and a second place during the race.

Teams
24 teams were invited to take part in the race. These included eleven UCI WorldTeams, six UCI Professional Continental teams, and seven UCI Continental teams.

Route
The route for the race was announced on 8 December 2016.

Stages

Stage 1
15 February 2017 — Albufeira to Lagos,

Stage 2
16 February 2017 — Lagoa to Fóia,

Stage 3
17 February 2017 — Sagres to Sagres, individual time trial (ITT)

Stage 4
18 February 2017 — Almodôvar to Tavira,

Stage 5
19 February 2017 — Loulé to Alto do Malhão,

Classification leadership table
In the 2017 Volta ao Algarve, four different jerseys were awarded. For the general classification, calculated by adding each cyclist's finishing times on each stage, and allowing time bonuses for the first three finishers at intermediate sprints and at the finish of mass-start stages, the leader received a yellow jersey. This classification was considered the most important of the 2017 Volta ao Algarve, and the winner of the classification was considered the winner of the race.

Additionally, there was a points classification, which awarded a red jersey. In the points classification, cyclists received points for finishing in the top 10 in a mass-start stage. For winning a stage, a rider earned 25 points, with 20 for second, 16 for third, 13 for fourth, 10 for fifth, 8 for sixth, 6 for seventh, 4 for eighth, 2 for ninth and 1 for tenth place. Points towards the classification could also be accrued at intermediate sprint points during each stage; these intermediate sprints also offered bonus seconds towards the general classification. There was also a mountains classification, the leadership of which was marked by a blue jersey. In the mountains classification, points were won by reaching the top of a climb before other cyclists, with more points available for the higher-categorised climbs.

The fourth jersey represented the young rider classification, marked by a white jersey. This was decided in the same way as the general classification, but only riders born after 1 January 1994 were eligible to be ranked in the classification. There was also a classification for teams, in which the times of the best three cyclists per team on each stage were added together; the leading team at the end of the race was the team with the lowest total time.

References

External links

 

2017 UCI Europe Tour
2017 in Portuguese sport
2017